All Blues is an album by bassist Ron Carter recorded at 
Van Gelder Studio in New Jersey in 1973 and released on the CTI label.

Reception
The Allmusic review by Scott Yanow awarded the album 4½ stars, stating: "One of bassist Ron Carter's better albums as a leader... the quality of the solos is high, and this date lives up to one's expectations."

Track listing
All compositions by Ron Carter except as indicated
 "A Feeling" - 3:23
 "Light Blue" - 6:47
 "117 Special" - 7:06
 "Rufus" - 5:14
 "All Blues" (Miles Davis) - 9:35
 "Will You Still Be Mine" (Tom Adair, Matt Dennis) - 3:56
Recorded at Van Gelder Studio in Englewood Cliffs, New Jersey, on October 24, 1973

Personnel
Ron Carter - bass, piccolo bass
Joe Henderson - tenor saxophone (tracks 1 & 3-5)
Roland Hanna - piano (tracks 1, 2, 4 & 5)
Richard Tee  - electric piano (track 3)
Billy Cobham - drums, percussion (tracks 1-5)

References

1973 albums
CTI Records albums
Ron Carter albums
Albums produced by Creed Taylor
Albums recorded at Van Gelder Studio